Pogledaj u sutra (Look Into The Future) is the debut album by Cveta Majtanović, the winner of the Balkan Idol'''s first season.

It was released in February 2007 by Automatik Records, an independent Belgrade label. Pogledaj u sutra'' contains 11 songs. Each of them have been produced by Belgian and Poland producers, at BMG studios. The album is a mix of different genres. There is mainly pop, but funk, reggae, R&B, & soul can also be found.

Track listing

Singles
"Pop Trash" was not released neither as CD single nor as a video. It debuted at Feras 2006 (Serbian Radio Festival 2006), and Cveta with her management decided not to do video for this song because it debuted at festival. "Pogledaj u sutra" (Look Into Tomorrow) was released as video, not as CD single. It is assumed that the third single will also be released just as video.
 
 "Pop Trash" (December 2006)
 "Pogledaj u sutra" (March 2007)
 "TBA" (2007)

References 

2007 debut albums
Cveta Majtanović albums